Robert Hancock may refer to:
 Robert Hancock (footballer), Australian rules footballer for St Kilda
 Robert Hancock (engraver), English engraver
 Robert E. W. Hancock, Canadian microbiologist
 Bob Hancock, Australian rules footballer for North Melbourne